"Couldn't Last a Moment" is a song written by Danny Wells and Jeffrey Steele, and recorded by American country music singer Collin Raye.  It was released in February 2000 as the first single from his album Tracks.  The song peaked at number 3 on the U.S. Billboard country music charts and reached number 1 on the Canadian RPM Country Tracks.  It also peaked at number 43 on the Billboard Hot 100 becoming Raye's third biggest crossover hit.  It was Raye's last top 40 hit on the U.S. country chart.

Background
Raye stated that the song is one of the "most vulnerable" he's ever recorded. "The guy has his heart on his sleeve," he says. "Before, I would have been afraid to cut a song like that because it mirrored my life. Lyrically it's so vulnerable."

Content
In the song, the narrator expresses his feelings after breaking up with his girlfriend. He states that he "couldn't last a moment" without her and attempts to get her back.

Chart performance
The song debuted at number 53 on the Billboard Hot Country Singles & Tracks chart dated February 5, 2000.

Year-end charts

References

2000 singles
2000 songs
Collin Raye songs
Song recordings produced by Dann Huff
Songs written by Jeffrey Steele
Music videos directed by Steven Goldmann
Songs written by Danny Wells (songwriter)
Epic Records singles